2005 Spanish regional elections may refer to:

2005 Basque regional election
2005 Galician regional election